Keira McLaughlin (born April 5, 2000) is a Canadian curler originally from Fredericton, New Brunswick. She currently plays third on Team Abby Deschene.

Career
McLaughlin has represented New Brunswick at four Canadian Junior Curling Championships with two bronze medals to her name in 2016 and 2018. She also has a very accomplished Under 18 championship record. She won silver medals in both 2016 and 2017 at the 2016 U18 International Curling Championships and the 2017 Canadian U18 Curling Championships. Still of junior age, she has participated in the past few New Brunswick Scotties Tournament of Hearts. In 2017, they lost the semifinal to the Melissa Adams rink and in 2018 they lost the tiebreaker to Sarah Mallais. She did not participate in the 2019 playdowns as she was at the 2019 Canadian Junior Curling Championships. The Comeau rink would lose another semifinal at the 2020 provincials, this time to the Sylvie Quillian rink. Later that season, Team Comeau represented the UNB Reds at the 2020 U Sports/Curling Canada University Curling Championships. There, they made it all the way to the final where they lost to the Alberta Pandas skipped by Selena Sturmay.

Teams

Notes

References

External links

Living people
Canadian women curlers
Curlers from New Brunswick
Sportspeople from Fredericton
University of New Brunswick alumni
2000 births